The 2003 Forest Heath District Council election took place on 1 May 2003 to elect members of Forest Heath District Council in England. This was on the same day as other local elections.

The whole council was up for election on new ward boundaries. The number of seats increased from 25 to 27.

Summary

|}

By-elections

Manor

Red Lodge

References

2003 English local elections
May 2003 events in the United Kingdom
2003
2000s in Suffolk